Carlos Mauricio Prudencio Oliva (born February 24, 1980) is a retired male Olympic backstroke swimmer from Bolivia. He swam for Bolivia at the:
Olympics: 2000, 2004
World Championships: 2003

In 2001, he set the Bolivian Records in the long course 50 and 100 backstroke (27.85 and 59.90), and in 2003 he set the national marks in the long course 200 back (2:10.87), and at the same meet in Spain, all 3 short course backstroke marks (26.14, 56.79 and 2:02.26).

References

External links

1980 births
Living people
Bolivian male swimmers
Bolivian male freestyle swimmers
Male backstroke swimmers
Swimmers at the 1999 Pan American Games
Swimmers at the 2003 Pan American Games
Swimmers at the 2000 Summer Olympics
Swimmers at the 2004 Summer Olympics
Olympic swimmers of Bolivia
Pan American Games competitors for Bolivia
21st-century Bolivian people